Hemaris rubra, the Kashmir bee hawkmoth, is a moth of the family Sphingidae. The species was first described by George Hampson in 1893.3 It is known from a number of valleys in Kashmir. The habitat consists of flower-rich meadows at around 2,500 meters.

The wingspan is 44–58 mm. It is a diurnal species. Adults are on wing from mid-June to early August in one generation per year.

References

R
 Moths of Asia
 Moths described in 1893